"Cúnla" is an Irish folk song, originally composed in the Irish language.

History 
Cúnla is a sean-nós children's song believed to have been composed sometime in the 14th century. The song is still well known and widely sung in Ireland and recordings have been published by many artists including Joe Heaney on the album The Road from Connemara, The Dubliners, John Spillane, The Chieftains, Christy Moore, Gaelic Storm, Planxty and The Scratch. An original musical setting of a version of the text by composer Michael McGlynn entitled "Cúnnla" has been recorded by Anúna.

Irish Version  and translation
Véarsa a haon
Cé hé siúd thíos 'tá ag leagadh na gclaíochaí? x 3
(Who is that down there knocking down the (stone) walls?)
"Mise mé féin" a deir Cúnnla.
("Me, myself" says Cúnla.)

Curfá
A Chúnla a chroí ná tar níos goire dhom! x 3
(Cúnnla dear don't come any nearer to me!)
Go deimhin muise tiocfaidh! a deir Cúnla.
("Surely I will!" says Cúnla.)

Véarsa a dó
Cé hé siúd thíos 'tá ag buaileadh na fuinneoige? x 3
(Who is that down there knocking the window?)
"Mise mé féin" a deir Cúnla.
("Me, myself" says Cúnla.)

Véarsa a trí
Cé hé siúd thíos 'tá ag fadú na tine dhom? x 3
(Who is that down there fanning the fire for me?)
"Mise mé féin" a deir Cúnla.
("Me, myself" says Cúnla.)

Véarsa a ceathar
Cé hé siúd thíos 'tá a' cur uisce sa gciteal dhom? x 3
(Who is that down there putting water into the kettle for me?)
"Mise mé féin" a deir Cúnnla.
("Me, myself" says Cúnla.)

Véarsa a cúig
Cé hé siúd thíos 'tá ag tarraingt na pluide dhíom? x 3
(Who is that down there pulling the blanket off me?)
"Mise mé féin" a deir Cúnnla.
("Me, myself" says Cúnla.)

Véarsa a sé
Cé hé siúd thíos 'tá ag tochas mo bhonnachaí? x 3
(Who is that down there tickling the soles of my feet?)
"Mise mé féin" a deir Cúnla.
("Me, myself" says Cúnla.)

English Versions 
There are various English versions translated from the Irish language. Here are two commonly-sung versions:

Version #1 
As recorded by Planxty on the album 'The Well Below the Valley'

And who is that there knocking the window pane?  x 3
'Only me' says Cúnnla

'Chorus'
Cúnla Dear, Don't Come Any Nearer Me x 3
Maybe I Shouldn't, Says Cúnla

And who is that there tickling the toes of me? x 3
'Only me' says Cúnnla

And who is that there tickling the thighs of me? x 3
'Only me' says Cúnnla

See also 
Lullaby
Celtic Music
Ireland
Irish language
Music of Ireland
Folk music of Ireland
Sean-nós singing

References 

Irish folk music
The Dubliners songs
Irish-language songs